False fritillary refers to certain brush-footed butterflies which look alike but are not closely related to the fritillaries of the Heliconiinae:

 the Caribbean genus Anetia of the Danainae, in particular:
 Anetia pantheratus
 Anetia briarea (lesser false fritillary)
 the monotypic African genus Pseudargynnis of the Limenitidinae

Animal common name disambiguation pages